Liberation of Susangerd (also known as "Susangerd-Operation") was a military operation during Iran-Iraq War, which was commenced on 19 November 1980 by the common command of Islamic Republic of Iran Army and Islamic Revolutionary Guard Corps and "Irregular Forces Headquarters". This operation's goal was to save Susangard city from the danger of a certain fall.

At the operation of Susangerd there were 24 pilots who participated in the operation, and some of them were killed, namely:

 Hushang Kiyan Ara
 Seyyed Mohammad-Taqi Hosseini
 Mohammad Kam-Bakhsh Ziyaei
 Nematollah Akbari Samani
 Yunes Khosh-Bin
 Ebrahim Omid-Bakhsh
 
The list of the pilots (of F5/F14) who took part in Susangerd-operation, is as follows:

 Davoud Sadeqi
 Mahmoud Naeimi 
 Shir-Afkan Hemmati
 Jalal Aram
 Parviz Nasri
 Behnam Qanamiyan
 Ahmad Mehr-Niya
 Seyyed Esmaeil Mousavi
 Siyavash Moshiri
 Habibollah Baqaei 
 Davoud Salman
 Qasem Mohammad Amini 
 Iraj Osareh
 Akbar Tavangariyan
 Mohammad Masbouq
 Reza Ramezani 
 Fazlollah Javid-Niya
 Davoud Asgari
  
Eventually, at Susangerd operation, Iranian forces broke the siege of the city, and rejected the Iraqis forces.

See also 
 Liberation of Khorramshahr

References

Iran–Iraq War
Battles involving Iran
Battles involving Iraq
Military operations of the Iran–Iraq War